(January 10, 1964 – April 17, 2021
) was a Japanese animator, illustrator, mechanical designer, and animation director primarily known for BECK: Mongolian Chop Squad and Paradise Kiss; his guest appearance as director of episode 4 of Gurren Lagann, and, most recently, episode 15 of Dororo. After graduating from high school, he worked as a designer and manga artist, but following his participation in Grandia he was mainly active in the field of animation. He originally directed avant-garde shorts and music videos for Studio 4°C and has more recently done two TV series for Madhouse Studios. Kobayushi was diagnosed with kidney cancer in 2019, and died on April 17, 2021, at 57 years old, due to a relapse of a colon infection. His name is occasionally rendered in full katakana to differentiate from Osamu Kobayashi, an unrelated anime episode director.

Filmography

Director
 table&fishman (short) (2002) (first directorial work)
 End of the world (short - part of Grasshoppa! series) (2002)
 Beck: Mongolian Chop Squad (TV) (2004-2005)
 Paradise Kiss (TV) (2005)
 Sancha (The Aromatic Tea) Blues (short) (2007)
 Someday's Dreamers: Summer Skies (TV) (2008)
 Naruto: Shippuden (TV) (2016) (eps 480–483)
 Rinshi! Ekoda-chan (TV) (2019) (ep 11)

Other
 Venus Wars (Movie) (1989) - Mecha cleanup
 Grandia (Game) (1997) - World setting design
 Blue Submarine No. 6 (OVA) (1998) - Art design, art setting
 Evolution: The World of Sacred Device (Game) (1999) - World setting design, mechanical design, demo director
 Gungrave (Game) (2002) - Art design, mechanical design, stage concept design
 Gad Guard (TV) (2003) - Set design, original drawing animation director, storyboard, episode director, key animation, ending animation
 Kaiketsu Zorori (TV) (2004) - Ending animation
 Zoids: Genesis (TV) (2005-2006) - Digald concept design
 Kemonozume (TV) (2006) - Storyboard, episode director, animation director, key animation (ep 7)
 Gurren Lagann (TV) (2008) - Storyboard, episode director, animation director, key animation (ep 4)
 Hanamaru Kindergarten (TV) (2010) - ED animation special director, animation director (ep 7)
 Panty & Stocking with Garterbelt (TV) (2010) - Setting, episode director, storyboard, key animation (ep 5b)
 Tegami Bachi REVERSE (TV) (2010) - ED2 illustration
 The Mystic Archives of Dantalian (TV) (2011) - Storyboard, episode director (ep 9)
 One Night City (Manga) (2014)
 The Last: Naruto the Movie (Movie) (2014) - Concept art
 Garo: Crimson Moon (TV) (2014) - Storyboard (ep 4)
 Lupin the 3rd Part IV: The Italian Adventure (TV) (2015) - Storyboard, episode director (ep 12)
 Dororo (TV) (2019) - Storyboard and episode director (ep 15), ending animation

References

External links
 
 Kojimorimoto.net - Osamu Kobayashi Bio (French)
 

1964 births
2021 deaths
Japanese animators
Japanese illustrators
Japanese animated film directors
Japanese music video directors
Japanese storyboard artists
Mechanical designers (mecha)
Deaths from kidney cancer
Deaths from cancer in Japan